Anders Sandoe Oersted may refer to:

Anders Sandøe Ørsted, Danish politician
Anders Sandoe Oersted (botanist), his son, Danish botanist